William Brewer may refer to:

William Brewer (justice) (died 1226), administrator and justice in England
William Briwere (died 1244), his nephew, medieval bishop of Exeter
William Henry Brewer (1828–1910), American botanist
William M. Brewer (died 1921), mayor of Omaha, Nebraska, 1873–1874
William J. Brewer (1843–1878), American soldier and Medal of Honor recipient
Billy Brewer (1935–2018), American football player and head coach
Billy Brewer (baseball) (born 1968), retired Major League Baseball player
Billy Brewer (footballer) (1893–1914), English footballer
William Brewer (MP) (1811–1881), British Member of Parliament for Colchester
William Brewer (sheriff) (died 1817), Sheriff of Norfolk County, Massachusetts 1811 to 1812
William D. Brewer (1922–2009), American diplomat